There have been eight baronets surnamed Dickson holding between them two baronetcies:

The Dickson baronetcy of Sornbeg in Ayrshire  was created in the Baronetage of Nova Scotia on 28 February 1695 for Robert Dickson and became either extinct or dormant on the death of the second baronet in 1760.

The Dickson baronetcy of Hardingham Hall in Norfolk was created in the Baronetage of the United Kingdom on 21 September 1802 for Admiral Archibald Dickson. The 6th baronet was elevated to the peerage as Baron Islington in 1910 and died with no son in 1936, when his titles became extinct.

References

Baronetcies in the Baronetage of Nova Scotia
Baronetcies in the Baronetage of the United Kingdom